The Men's 10m Platform event at the 2010 South American Games was held on March 23 at 14:00.

Medalists

Results

References
Summary

10m M